Colonel Robert Stuart Macrae TD was an inventor best known for his work at MD1 during the Second World War, his best known invention being the sticky bomb.

Macrae was the author of Winston Churchill's Toyshop, a memoir detailing his experiences at MD1.

Early career 
Macrae had been a trainee engineer and late in the First World War worked on a device for dropping grenades as an early form of cluster bomb. The war ended before the device was used or he received any commission for his work.

Macrae was an editor of Armchair Science magazine during the period leading up to the Second World War. He was approached by Millis Jefferis who was after strong magnets for a secret explosive project. Already security cleared from his previous work, Macrae was able to join in the project.

Second World War 
Macrae was called up as a second lieutenant on the Special List of the Territorial Army on 1 September 1939. with the effect that he had to give up editing Armchair Science and a gardening magazine at the same publisher.

One of Macrae's first weapons inventions was a limpet mine. The mine was developed by Macrae and Cecil Vandepeer Clarke in 1939 using improvised development techniques.

Macrae was the administrator of MD1, but also able to continue to be involved in developing weapons and devices.

By the end of the war he was a war substantive lieutenant colonel.
His promotion to full colonel, as a result of MD1 being upgraded to a Grade A Establishment, was halted by the end of the war.
He remained in the TA after the war, transferring to the Royal Electrical and Mechanical Engineers (REME) as a substantive major on 9 October 1947 (with seniority from 6 October 1942).

Later career 

In 1947, Macrae applied to the Royal Commission on Awards to Inventors with regards to his part in the development of the Sticky Bomb. His application was actively opposed on the basis that he was provided with the concept "on a plate" – the basic concept had been devised by Millis Jefferis. Macrae did not contradict this, but emphasised his part in the development of the weapon. He was promoted to substantive lieutenant colonel on 1 July 1950, and awarded the Territorial Efficiency Decoration, with clasp on 15 June 1951.

In 1953, Macrae was questioned about his possession of certain documents originating from his time at MD1. Matters came to light as he again applied to the Royal Commission on Awards to Inventors for his wartime work on a variety of gadgets. Some of the documents were secret or top secret. He explained that he had taken the papers home for safe keeping when The Firs closed in 1947 because no one else would take them away and they were left lying on the workshop floor and he was soon exonerated of any wrongdoing. As the hearing progressed, Major-General J. F. C. Holland, Major-General Sir Colin Gubbins gave evidence to the commission explaining the usefulness of the unorthodox weapons. Macrae shared a number of awards from the Royal Commission on Awards to Inventors:
£600 [equivalent to £ in ] jointly for the L-delay Switch;
£400 [£] for the limpet mine,
£300 [£] for an air-pressure switch and
£200 [£] for igniters, detonators and signal flashes. He retired from army service on 1 January 1955, and was granted the honorary rank of colonel.

Between 1956 and 1970, Macrae took out a number of patents relating to reflecting road studs.

In 1971, Macrae published the book "Winston Churchill's Toyshop," detailing his work at MD1, one of the most famous and successful of all the British secret "back rooms" of World War II. Macrae's book traces his work at the "toyshop," from the limpet mine, a delayed action mine, to the sticky bomb and the Blacker Bombard, to giant, bridge-carrying assault tanks (the Great Eastern). The workshop operated initially out of a tiny basement workshop and later from a country mansion. It produced an astonishing variety of ingenious and secret weapons that destroyed innumerable German tanks, aircraft and ships.

Macrae's first wife Mary died at the family home in Beacon Way, Banstead on 24 May 1973. The Macraes had three children, David, John and Vivien.

In 1977, Macrae was engaged to be married to Anne Vivien Hall. The following year, Macrae and his new wife attended a luncheon party given by Queen Elizabeth II on the Royal Yacht Britannia.

Notes

References

External links 
 
Churchillhouse toyshop
The Papers of Colonel R S Macrae held at Churchill Archives Centre

English inventors
Weapon designers
British Army personnel of World War II
Royal Electrical and Mechanical Engineers officers